Ian Douglas Frazer (born 7 September 1966) is an Australian cricket coach, sports scientist and biomechanist, and a former first-class cricketer. From 2005 to 2007, Frazer served as the biomechanist for the Indian national cricket team and assistant to the team coach Greg Chappell.

Biography
Ian Douglas Frazer was born in Lilydale, Victoria, a suburb of Melbourne, Australia on 7 September 1966. He received cricket training at the Commonwealth Bank Cricket Academy in 1988. He began playing first-class and List A cricket for the Victoria cricket team in 1986 as a left-hand batsman; his career lasted until 1990. After the end of his playing career, Frazer worked for some time in business and computing technology before collaborating with Chappell to develop the cricket training programme, "The Chappell Way".

Stint with India
In 2005, Frazer was chosen by Australian cricketer Greg Chappell, who had been appointed the coach of the Indian cricket team to serve as his assistant and the team's biomechanist. During Chappell's tenure, Frazer worked to enforce Chappell's training regime to increase the physical fitness of the players, and defended Chappell amidst criticism from the media. Frazer supported Chappell's stance emphasizing the introduction of younger players into the national team in favour of older, more experienced veterans.

Despite some praise from players, Frazer was criticised in the media over the ambiguity of his role and the job he was supposed to be doing; critics accused him of doing no more than conducting basic practice. While Chappell said that Frazer's inclusion was important for his coaching vision, Frazer's lackluster first-class playing credentials were cited as insufficient by outsiders, while calls increased for the appointment of a specialist bowling coach. Frazer resigned along with Chappell after the Indian team's poor performance in the 2007 Cricket World Cup.

See also
 List of Victoria first-class cricketers

References

Australian cricket coaches
Australian cricketers
Victoria cricketers
1966 births
Coaches of the Indian national cricket team
Living people
Cricketers from Melbourne
People from Lilydale, Victoria